The Book of Mormon, the founding document of the Latter Day Saint movement and one of the four books of scripture of the Church of Jesus Christ of Latter-day Saints (LDS Church), is an account of three groups of people. According to the book, two of these groups originated from ancient Israel. There is generally no direct support amongst mainstream historians and archaeologists for the historicity of the Book of Mormon.

Since the late 1990s pioneering work of Luigi Luca Cavalli-Sforza and others, scientists have developed techniques that attempt to use genetic markers to indicate the ethnic background and history of individual people. The data developed by these mainstream scientists tell us that the Native Americans have very distinctive DNA markers, and that some of them are most similar, among old world populations, to the DNA of people anciently associated with the Altay Mountains area of central Asia. These evidences from a genetic perspective agree with a large body of archaeological, anthropological, and linguistic conclusions that Native American peoples' ancestors migrated from Asia at the latest 16,500–13,000 years ago. (See Settlement of the Americas and Genetic history of indigenous peoples of the Americas).

The mainstream scientific consensus about the origin of the ancient Americans is at odds with the claims put forth in the Book of Mormon, though Mormon apologists have made efforts to reconcile these contradictions. The LDS Church released an essay on their website titled "Book of Mormon and DNA Studies". The conclusion states, "Much as critics and defenders of the Book of Mormon would like to use DNA studies to support their views, the evidence is simply inconclusive."

Overview of the genetic challenges to the Book of Mormon story

The genetic challenge
The understanding of Joseph Smith and of traditional Mormonism is that the Book of Mormon reveals that some American Indians are descendants of the Lamanites, who descended from Lehi and are therefore a "remnant of the House of Israel."

Researchers compare existing genetic evidence with the Book of Mormon story
Mormon researchers such as anthropologist Thomas W. Murphy and ex-Mormon plant geneticist Simon Southerton state that the substantial collection of Native American genetic markers now available are not consistent with any detectable presence of ancestors from the ancient Middle East. They have argued that this poses substantial evidence to contradict the account in the Book of Mormon. Both Murphy and Southerton have published their views on this subject . The arguments of both Murphy and Southerton were disputed by David G. Stewart in a 2006 edition of FARMS Review.

Follow-up of genetic claims in the media
Southerton's work was later used as a source for a 2006 article written by William Lobdell and published in the Los Angeles Times, which stated: "For Mormons, the lack of discernible Hebrew blood in Native Americans is no minor collision between faith and science. It burrows into the historical foundations of the Book of Mormon, a 175-year-old transcription that the church regards as literal and without error."

Lobdell's article prompted a response from Latter-day Saint supporters, including several articles referenced on the official LDS Church's web site.

The origin of groups described in the Book of Mormon

Statements regarding the Hebrew ancestry of Book of Mormon people
LDS Church leaders have long equated Amerindians with Lamanites. In the Doctrine and Covenants, revelations delivered by Joseph Smith refer to native people in the United States as "Lamanites". Smith reported that when the golden plates were revealed to him in New York, an angel told him that the plates contained "an account of the former inhabitants of this continent, and the source from whence they sprang." Brigham Young and other 19th-century church leaders generally equated Lamanites with the native Indians of the Americas.

In the October 1959 church general conference, apostle Spencer W. Kimball stated: "Millions of you have blood relatively unmixed with Gentiles. Columbus called you 'Indians,' thinking he had reached the East Indies. ... The Lord calls you 'Lamanites,' a name which has a pleasant ring, for many of the grandest people ever to live upon the earth were so called. In a limited sense, the name signifies the descendants of Laman and Lemuel, sons of your first American parent, Lehi; but you undoubtedly possess also the blood of the other sons, Sam, Nephi, and Jacob. And you likely have some Jewish blood from Mulek, son of Zedekiah, king of Judah (Hel. 6:10). ... You came from Jerusalem in its days of tribulation. You are of royal blood, a loved people of the Lord. In your veins flows the blood of prophets and statesmen". Similarly, at a 1971 Lamanite Youth Conference, Kimball stated: "With pride I tell those who come to my office that a Lamanite is a descendant of one Lehi who left Jerusalem six hundred years before Christ and with his family crossed the mighty deep and landed in America. And Lehi and his family became the ancestors of all of the Indian and Mestizo tribes in North and South and Central America and in the islands of the sea". Ted E. Brewerton, a general authority of the LDS Church, stated in 1995: "Many migratory groups came to the Americas, but none was as important as the three mentioned in the Book of Mormon. The blood of these people flows in the veins of the Blackfoot and the Blood Indians of Alberta, Canada; in the Navajo and the Apache of the American Southwest; the Inca of western South America; the Aztec of Mexico; the Maya of Guatemala; and in other native American groups in the Western Hemisphere and the Pacific islands".

An introductory paragraph added to the Book of Mormon in the LDS Church's 1981 edition stated in part: "After thousands of years, all were destroyed except the Lamanites, and they are the principal ancestors of the American Indians."  In a 2006 edition, the statement was altered to indicate that "the Lamanites ... are among the ancestors of the American Indians." This change, church leaders said, was in harmony with the claims of the Book of Mormon itself, and what some Latter-day Saints had long perceived. For instance, in 1929 Anthony W. Ivins, of the LDS Church's First Presidency, cautioned church members: "We must be careful in the conclusions that we reach. The Book of Mormon teaches the history of three distinct peoples ... who came from the old world to this continent. It does not tell us that there was no one here before them. It does not tell us that people did not come after. And so if discoveries are made which suggest differences in race origins, it can very easily be accounted for, and reasonably, for we do believe that other people came to this continent. A thousand years had elapsed from the time the Book of Mormon closed until the discovery of America, and we know that other people came to America during that period."

The origin of the Jaredites
According to the Book of Mormon, the Jaredites were a group of people that left the Old World after the fall of the Tower of Babel. Some Mormon researchers believe that Jaredite survivors of the war that destroyed their civilization, as described in the Book of Ether, could be ancestors to some Native Americans . Some writers theorized that American Indians received their Asiatic genetic heritage from the Jaredites .

Nephites and Lamanites in the Book of Mormon
According to the Book of Mormon, the terms "Nephites" and "Lamanites" actually lose their original significance pursuant to the visitation of Jesus Christ to the American continent after his resurrection; his coming ushered in a period of peace in which the two conflicting nations merged into one, in which "[t]here were no robbers, nor murderers, neither were there Lamanites, nor any manner of -ites; but they were in one, the children of Christ, and heirs to the kingdom of God.".  Later on in the narrative, as members of the unified nation fell away from the faith, the term "Lamanite" comes to signify wickedness rather than blood heritage, whereas "Nephite" came to signify a follower of Christ; both terms alluded to the previous nations' predominant moral tendencies. Eventually, however, even the righteous "Nephites" grew proud and fell into wickedness more severe than that of those termed Lamanites. The Nephites battled with the Lamanites until around AD 400, near the close of the Book of Mormon, the Nephites were annihilated by the Lamanites. The nation of the Lamanites is understood to have continued on beyond the close of the Book of Mormon.

Response to the genetic challenge from Book of Mormon defenders

Book of Mormon population models
Defenders of the Book of Mormon have made arguments that center on the idea that the Book of Mormon peoples from the Middle East formed only a small portion of the population of the Americas, and that their genetic heritage may have been diluted beyond what can now be detected. The Limited Geography Model of the Book of Mormon supports this position. This geographical and population model was formally published in an official LDS Church magazine, The Ensign, in a two-part series published in September and October 1984.

Critics of the Limited Geography Model say that the Book of Mormon does not make clear reference to any other group of people that may have existed in the Americas alongside Book of Mormon people that would account for the dilution of the Middle Eastern genetic markers in the New World.  Therefore, it is argued, a "traditional reading" of the Book of Mormon suggests that "most, if not all" of the ancestry of the pre-Columbian inhabitants of the Americas came from this Hebrew migration in ancient times .

According to the Limited Geography Model proponents, the most direct evidence of prior inhabitants was when Lehi's party found domesticated animals when they arrived in the Americas.

Advocates of the mound builder setting for the Book of Mormon maintain that native peoples of Central and South America are predominantly of Asiatic origin.

Factors affecting DNA composition of the New World population

Michael F. Whiting, director of Brigham Young University's DNA Sequencing Center and an associate professor in BYU's Department of Integrative Biology, concluded in his article "DNA and the Book of Mormon: A Phylogenetic Perspective" that Book of Mormon critics attempting to use DNA "have not given us anything that would pass the muster of peer review by scientists in this field, because they have ignored the real complexity of the issues involved. Further, they have overlooked the entire concept of hypothesis testing in science and believe that just because they label their results as 'based on DNA,' they have somehow proved that the results are accurate or that they have designed the experiment correctly. At best, they have demonstrated that the global colonization hypothesis is an oversimplified interpretation of the Book of Mormon. At worst, they have misrepresented themselves and the evidence in the pursuit of other agendas." Additionally, although he admits the usefulness of population genetics and of DNA in inferring historical events, he contests that, "given the complexities of genetic drift, founder effect, and introgression, the observation that Native Americans have a preponderance of Asian genes does not conclusively demonstrate that they are therefore not descendants of the Lamanite lineage, because we do not know what genetic signature that Lamanite lineage possessed at the conclusion of the Book of Mormon record." Lastly, he concludes, "[There is] a strong possibility that there was substantial introgression of genes from other human populations into the genetic heritage of the Nephites and Lamanites, such that a unique genetic marker to identify someone unambiguously as a Lamanite, if it ever existed, was quickly lost." and that, "[t]here are some very good scientific reasons for why the Book of Mormon is neither easily corroborated nor refuted by DNA evidence, and current attempts to do so are based on dubious science" .

Murphy has responded to Whiting's comments as follows: "While Whiting, in his presentation for FARMS at BYU, exclaimed delight at the prospect of evolutionary biology coming to the defense of the Book of Mormon, he offered no scientific data to substantiate an Israelite origin of indigenous peoples anywhere in the Americas. In fact, he conceded, 'current genetic evidence suggests that Native Americans have a genetic history representative of Asia and not the Middle East.'" Murphy further states: "One of the most surprising critiques to emerge was the false allegation that I am evading peer review or that the research I reviewed would not stand up to peer review ... [T]he article ["Lamanite Genesis, Genealogy, and Genetics"] was a summary of genetic research on Native American origins, nearly all of which had been subjected to peer review prior to publication in leading scientific journals such as American Journal of Human Genetics, Proceedings of the National Academy of Sciences, and American Journal of Physical Anthropology ... Whiting's and Lambert's claims are little more than an inaccurate projection of the inadequacies of LDS apologetics onto my publications."

Response to West Eurasian origins
In November 2013 Nature published a discovery on an Upper Paleolithic Siberian site linking Western Eurasians in the Middle East and Europe to the indigenous Native American population. According to the study the genomes sequenced show distinct genetic markers that are unique to the indigenous Native Americans and western Eurasia, but with no relation to East Asians. The study indicates that 14–38% of Native American ancestry may originate through this gene flow. One of the authors, Professor Kelly Graf, explained the significance of this, stating that:

Our findings are significant at two levels. First, it shows that Upper Paleolithic Siberians came from a cosmopolitan population of early modern humans that spread out of Africa to Europe and Central and South Asia. Second, Paleoindian skeletons like Buhl Woman with phenotypic traits atypical of modern-day indigenous Americans can be explained as having a direct historical connection to Upper Paleolithic Siberia.

Book of Mormon defenders have responded to the article with reservation. While the descendants of Lehi would carry similar genetic markers, defenders have pointed out that the genome would have already been in the Western Hemisphere far earlier than the Book of Mormon claims.

Notes

References

.
.
.
.
.
.
.
.
.
.
.
.
.
.
 .
.
.
.
.
.

Further reading

External links
 Murphy, Thomas W.'s Scholarly Papers, Social Science Research Network

Genetics
Book of Mormon studies
Criticism of Mormonism
Mormon, Genetics and the Book of
Groups claiming Jewish descent
Mormonism and Native Americans
Mormonism-related controversies